British School Muscat (BSM) is a not-for-profit, co-educational, British international day school in Muscat, Oman, that provides a comprehensive education to English-speaking expatriate pupils aged 3–18. The school follows an enhanced version of the English National curriculum. British School Muscat was established in 1971 when it was granted a Royal charter by Sultan Qaboos bin Said.

References

External links
 
 Article in the Oman Tribune

Muscat
Schools in Muscat, Oman
1971 establishments in Oman
Educational institutions established in 1971